The Meskwaki (sometimes spelled Mesquaki), also known by the European exonyms Fox Indians or the Fox, are a Native American people.  They have been closely linked to the Sauk people of the same language family. In the Meskwaki language, the Meskwaki call themselves , which means "the Red-Earths", related to their creation story. Historically their homelands were in the Great Lakes region. The tribe coalesced in the St. Lawrence River Valley in present-day Ontario, Canada. Under French colonial pressures, it migrated to the southern side of the Great Lakes to territory that much later was organized by European Americans as the states of Michigan, Wisconsin, Illinois, and Iowa.

The Meskwaki suffered damaging wars with the French and their Native American allies in the early 18th century, with one in 1730 decimating the tribe. Euro-American colonization and settlement proceeded in the United States during the 19th century and forced the Meskwaki/Fox south and west into the tall grass prairie in the American Midwest. In 1851 the Iowa state legislature passed an unusual act to allow the Fox to buy land and stay in the state. Other Sac and Fox were removed to Indian territory in what became Kansas, Oklahoma and Nebraska. In the 21st century, two federally recognized tribes of "Sac and Fox" have reservations, and one has a settlement.

Etymology
The name is derived from the Meskwaki creation myth, in which their culture hero, Wisaka, created the first humans out of red clay. They called themselves  in Meskwaki, meaning "the Red-Earths".

The name Fox later was derived from a French mistake during the colonial era: hearing a group of Indians identify as "Fox", the French applied what was a clan name to the entire tribe who spoke the same language, calling them "les Renards." Later the English and Anglo-Americans adopted the French name, using its translation in English as "Fox."  This name was also used officially by the United States government from the 19th century.

Ethnobotany
Historically the Meskwaki used Triodanis perfoliata as an emetic in tribal ceremonies to make one "sick all day long," smoking it at purification and other spiritual rituals. They smudge Symphyotrichum novae-angliae and use it to revive unconscious people. They used Agastache scrophulariifolia, an infusion of the root used as a diuretic, also using a compound of the plant heads medicinally. They eat the fruits of Viburnum prunifolium raw and cook them into a jam.  They make the flowers of Solidago rigida into a lotion and use them  on bee stings and for swollen faces.

History

Meskwaki are of Algonquian origin from the prehistoric Woodland period culture area. The Meskwaki language is a dialect of the Sauk-Fox-Kickapoo language spoken by the Sauk, Meskwaki, and Kickapoo, within the Algonquian languages family. Algonquians are a broad group which includes many tribes on the Atlantic Coast and around the Great Lakes.

The Meskwaki and Sauk peoples are two distinct tribal groups.  Linguistic and cultural connections between the two tribes have made them often associated in history.  Under US government recognition treaties, officials treat the Sac (anglicized Sauk term) and Meskwaki as a single political unit, despite their distinct identities.

Great Lakes region
Historically the Meskwaki lived along the Saint Lawrence River in present-day Ontario, northeast of Lake Ontario. The tribe may have numbered as many as 10,000, but years of war with the Huron, whom French colonial agents supplied with arms, and exposure to new European infectious diseases reduced their numbers. In response to these pressures, the Meskwaki migrated west, first to present-day eastern Michigan in the area between Saginaw Bay and Detroit west of Lake Huron. Later they moved further west into what is now Wisconsin.

The Meskwaki gained control of the Fox River system in eastern and central Wisconsin. This river became vital for the colonial New France fur trade through the interior of North America between northern French Canada, via the Mississippi River, and the French ports on the Gulf of Mexico. As part of the Fox–Wisconsin Waterway, the Fox River allowed travel from Lake Michigan and the other Great Lakes via Green Bay to the Mississippi River system.

At first European contact in 1698, the French estimated the number of Meskwaki as about 6,500. By 1712, the number of Meskwaki had declined to 3,500.

Fox Wars
The Meskwaki fought against the French, in what are called the Fox Wars, for more than three decades (1701–1742) to preserve their homelands. The Meskwaki resistance to French encroachment was highly effective. The King of France signed a decree  commanding the complete extermination of the Meskwaki, the only edict of its kind in French history.

The First Fox War with the French lasted from 1712 to 1714. This first Fox War was purely economic in nature, as the French wanted rights to use the river system to gain access to the Mississippi. After the Second Fox War of 1728, the Meskwaki were reduced to some 1500 people. They found shelter with the Sac, but French competition carried to that tribe. In the Second Fox War, the French increased their pressure on the tribe to gain access to the Fox and Wolf rivers. Nine hundred Fox (about 300 warriors and the remainder mostly women and children) tried to break out in Illinois to reach the English and Iroquois to the east, but they were greatly outnumbered by a combined force of French and hundreds of allied Native Americans. On September 9, 1730, most of the Fox warriors were killed; many women and children were taken captive into Indian slavery or killed by the French allies.

Midwest region
The Sauk and Meskwaki allied in 1735 in defense against the French and their allied Indian tribes. Descendants spread through southern Wisconsin, and along the present-day Illinois-Iowa border. In 1829 the US government estimated there were 1,500 Meskwaki along with 5,500 Sac (or Sauk). Both tribes relocated southward from Wisconsin into Iowa, Illinois, and Missouri. There are accounts of Meskwaki as far south as Pike County, Illinois.

The Anishinaabe peoples called the Meskwaki , meaning "people on the other shore", referring to their territories south of the Great Lakes. The French had adopted use of this name, and transliterated its spelling into their pronunciation system as Outagamie. This name was later used by Americans for today's Outagamie County, Wisconsin.

Kansas and Oklahoma
The Meskwaki and Sac were forced to leave their territory by land-hungry American settlers. President Andrew Jackson signed the Indian Removal Act of 1830 passed by Congress, authorizing US removal of eastern American Indians to lands west of the Mississippi River. The act was directed mainly at the Five Civilized Tribes in the American Southeast, but it was also used against tribes in what was then called the Northwest as well, the area east of the Mississippi and north of the Ohio River.

Some Meskwaki were involved with Sac warriors in the Black Hawk War over homelands in Illinois. After the Black Hawk War of 1832, the United States officially combined the two tribes into a single group known as the Sac & Fox Confederacy for treaty-making purposes. The United States persuaded the Sauk and Meskwaki to sell all their claims to land in Iowa in a treaty of October 1842. They moved to land west of a temporary line (Red Rock Line) in 1843.  They were removed to a reservation in east central Kansas in 1845 via the Dragoon Trace. The Dakota Sioux called the Meskwaki who moved west of the Mississippi River the "lost people" because they had been forced to leave their homelands. Some Meskwaki remained hidden in Iowa, with others returning within a few years. Soon after, the U.S. government forced the Sauk to a reservation in Indian Territory present-day Oklahoma.

Iowa

In 1851 the Iowa legislature passed an unprecedented act to allow the Meskwaki to buy land even though they had occupied it by right before and stay in the state. American Indians had not generally been permitted to do so, as the U.S. Government had said that tribal Indians were legally not US citizens. Only citizens could buy land.

In 1857, the Meskwaki purchased the first  in Tama County; Tama was named for Taimah, a Meskwaki chief of the early 19th century. Many Meskwaki later moved to the Meskwaki Settlement near Tama.

The U.S. government tried to force the tribe back to the Kansas reservation by withholding treaty-right annuities.  Ten years later, in 1867, the U.S. finally began paying annuities to the Meskwaki in Iowa.  They recognized the Meskwaki as the "Sac and Fox of the Mississippi in Iowa". The jurisdictional status was unclear.  The tribe had formal federal recognition with eligibility for Bureau of Indian Affairs services.  It also had a continuing relationship with the State of Iowa due to the tribe's private ownership of land, which was held in trust by the governor.

For the next 30 years, the Meskwaki were virtually ignored by federal as well as state policies, which generally benefited them. Subsequently, they lived more independently than tribes confined to Indian reservations regulated by federal authority. To resolve this jurisdictional ambiguity, in 1896 the State of Iowa ceded to the Federal government all jurisdiction over the Meskwaki.

20th century
By 1910, the Sac and Meskwaki together totaled only about 1,000 people. During the 20th century, they began to recover their cultures. By the year 2000, their numbers had increased to nearly 4,000.

In World War II, Meskwaki men enlisted in the U.S. Army. Several served as code talkers, along with Navajo and some other speakers of uncommon languages. Meskwaki men used their language to keep Allied communications secret in actions against the Germans in North Africa. Twenty-seven Meskwaki men, then 16% of the Meskwaki population in Iowa, enlisted together in the U.S. Army in January 1941.

The modern Meskwaki Settlement in Tama County maintains a casino, tribal schools, tribal courts, tribal police and a public works department.

Contemporary tribes
Today the three federally recognized Sac and Fox tribes are:
 Sac and Fox Nation, headquartered in Stroud, Oklahoma;
 Sac and Fox of the Mississippi in Iowa, headquartered in Tama, Iowa; and
 Sac and Fox Nation of Missouri in Kansas and Nebraska, headquartered in Reserve, Kansas.

Notable Meskwaki
Appanoose, chief
Ke-shes-wa, a Fox chief
Ray Young Bear, writer and poet
Marie-Angélique Memmie Le Blanc, captured by French
Duane Slick, artist
Ska-ba-quay Tesson, artist
Wapello, also featured in McKenney and Hall
Mary Young Bear, inducted into the Iowa Women's hall of Fame; 2021

See also
 
Iowa Tribe of Oklahoma
 Iowa Tribe of Kansas and Nebraska
 Indigenous peoples of the Eastern Woodlands
 Kickapoo
 Mascouten
 Native American tribes in Nebraska
 USS Appanoose (AK-226), a U.S. Navy ship named for Appanoose, a Meskwaki chief
 USS Wapello (YN-56), a U.S. Navy ship named for Wapello, a Meskwaki chief
 Mid-Continent Airlines

References

Further reading
 
 Buffalo, Jonathan 1993 Introduction to Mesquaki History, Parts I-III. The Legend:p. 11, 4.6, 6–7.
 Daubenmier, Judith M. 2008 The Meskwaki and Anthropologists. University of Nebraska Press, Lincoln.
 Edmunds, R. David, and Joseph L. Peyser 1993  The Fox Wars: The Mesquakie Challenge to New France. University of Oklahoma Press, Norman, Oklahoma.no
 Green, Michael D. 1977  Mesquakie Separatism in the Mid 19th Century. Center for the History of the American Indian, The Newberry Library Chicago, Chicago.
 Green, Michael D. 1983 "We Dance in Opposite Directions": Mesquakie (Fox) Separatism from the Sac and Fox Tribe. Ethnohistory 30(3):129–140.
 Gussow, Zachary 1974  Sac, Fox, and Iowa Indians I. American Indian Ethnohistory: North Central and Northeastern Indians American Indian Ethnohistory: North Central and Northeastern Indians. Garland Publishing, New York.
 Leinicke, Will 1981 The Sauk and Fox Indians in Illinois. Historic Illinois 3(5):1–6.
 Michelson, Truman 1927, 1930  Contributions to Fox Ethnology. Bureau of American Ethnology Bulletins 85, 95. Smithsonian Institution, Washington, D.C.
 Peattie, Lisa Redfield 1950  Being a Mesquakie Indian. University of Chicago, Chicago.
 Rebok, Horace M. 1900  The Last of the Mus-Qua-Kies and the Indian Congress 1898. W.R. Funk, Dayton, Ohio.
 Smith, Huron H. 1925 The Red Earth Indians. In Yearbook of the Public Museum of the City of Milwaukee, 1923, Vol. 3, edited by S. A. Barrett, pp. 27–38. Board of Trustees, The Milwaukee Public Museum, Milwaukee, Wisconsin.
 Smith, Huron H.  1928 Ethnobotany of the Meskwaki Indians. Bulletin of the Public Museum of the City of Milwaukee 4(2):175–326.
 Stout, David B., Erminie Wheeler-Voegelin, and Emily J. Blasingham 1974  Sac, Fox, and Iowa Indians II: Indians of E. Missouri, W. Illinois, and S. Wisconsin From the Proto-Historic Period to 1804. American Indian Ethnohistory. Garland Publishing, New York.
 Stucki, Larry R. 1967 Anthropologists and Indians: A New Look at the Fox Project. Plains Anthropologist 12:300–317.
 Torrence, Gaylord, and Robert Hobbs 1989  Art of the Red Earth People: The Mesquakie of Iowa. University of Iowa Museum of Art, Iowa City.
 VanStone, James W. 1998  Mesquakie (Fox) Material Culture: The William Jones and Frederick Starr Collections. Field Museum of Natural History, Chicago.
 Ward, Duren J. H. 1906 Meskwakia. Iowa Journal of History and Politics 4:178–219.

External links

  The 1730 Mesquakie Fort
 Official Site of the Sac and Fox Tribe of the Mississippi in Iowa/Meskwaki Nation – the Meskwaki
 Official Site of the Sac and Fox Nation (of Oklahoma) – the Thakiwaki or Sa ki wa ki
 Official Site of the Sac and Fox Nation of Missouri in Kansas and Nebraska – the Ne ma ha ha ki
 "Estimating the Location of the Red Rock Treaty Line in Iowa" (Historical summary and effort to locate original position)
 "Visitors Guide to Pike County Illinois" (Mentions presence of Sauk Fox Tribes in Pike County Illinois)

 
Algonquian ethnonyms
Algonquian peoples
Black Hawk War
Great Lakes tribes
Native American tribes in Iowa
Native American tribes in Kansas
Native American tribes in Missouri
Native American tribes in Nebraska
Native American tribes in Oklahoma
Native American tribes in Wisconsin
Native American tribes in Illinois
Native American tribes in Michigan
C